The 1877 Halifax by-election was fought on 20 February 1877.  The byelection was fought due to the resignation of the incumbent Liberal MP, John Crossley.  It was won by the Liberal candidate John Dyson Hutchinson.

References

1877 in England
Elections in Calderdale
Halifax, West Yorkshire
1877 elections in the United Kingdom
By-elections to the Parliament of the United Kingdom in West Yorkshire constituencies
19th century in Yorkshire